Bodyguard is a 2011 Indian romantic action film directed by Siddique. and produced by Alvira Khan Agnihotri and Atul Agnihotri. It features Salman Khan and Kareena Kapoor in the lead roles along with Raj Babbar, Mahesh Manjrekar and Hazel Keech in supporting roles. The film was released on Eid, 31 August 2011 across 2,250 screens in 70 Indian cities and with 482 prints across the overseas territory.

The film broke many records upon its release. Within the first day of its release, it went on to become the highest opening day grosser as well as the biggest grosser ever for a single day up until then. The film set another box office record, netting  in its first week, thus becoming the highest opening week grossing Bollywood film. Bodyguard has grossed  worldwide, and has emerged as Bollywood's second highest-grossing film ever. It is also the highest-grossing Bollywood film of 2011.

Bodyguard received a number of awards and nominations in several prominent award shows both in India and abroad, including the Filmfare Awards and Screen Awards. The majority of these were for the leading performances and musical achievements.

Awards and nominations

References

External links
Awards for Bodyguard at the Internet Movie Database

Lists of accolades by Indian film